Elsa Andrea Elisabeth Björkman-Goldschmidt (1888–1982) was a Swedish artist and writer who was active in Sweden and Austria. After attending Stockholm's Art Academy, she worked as an engraver and etcher. In 1916, while assisting the Red Cross in Russia, she met her future husband, the Austrian surgeon Waldemar Goldschmidt. They married in Vienna where she was involved with Save the Children and started working as a correspondent for the Swedish press. In 1938, anti-Semitism forced the couple to move to Sweden where she published a number of books about her life in Vienna.

Biography
Born in Linköping on 16 April 1888, Elsa Andrea Elisabeth Björkman-Goldschmidt was the daughter of the army officer Daniel Magnus Fredrik Björkman and his wife Maria née Heyman. After attending a teacher training course at the Anna Sandström Seminary in Stockholm (1906–1908), she travelled abroad to improve her language skills. She then spent a year at the Art Academy concentrating on etching, woodcut and lithography (1909–1910). She spent a further year studying graphic arts in Belgium, making study trips to Italy and Germany. She presented her work at exhibitions in Sweden and abroad.

In 1916, she travelled to Russia with her humanitarian friend Elsa Brändström to work an as untrained nurse in the Siberian prisoner-of-war camps. She returned to Russia a number of times in subsequent years as a delegate of the Swedish Red Cross, experiencing the Russian Revolution. She met her husband-to-be, the Austrian surgeon Waldemar Goldschmidt, in a Moscow hospital. After marrying in Vienna in 1921, they settled in the city where they became involved in various cultural associations, including the literary society Samfundet De Nio and the women's association Nya Idun. Elsa Björkman-Goldschmidt turned increasingly from art to writing, contributing columns to the Swedish daily Dagens Nyheter. In 1938, after the Nazis annexed Austria, as Jews they were forced to return to Sweden.

Björkman-Goldschmidt wrote accounts of her years in Vienna in a series of books published from the 1940s.

Elsa Björkman-Goldschmidt died in Stockholm on 6 April 1982.

References

Further reading 
  

1888 births
1982 deaths
People from Linköping
20th-century Swedish writers
20th-century Swedish artists
Swedish lithographers
Swedish women writers
Swedish women artists
Recipients of the Prince Eugen Medal
Members of Nya Idun